Beautiful is Park Jung-min's second Korean single. Besides its title track "Beautiful" and an acoustic and instrumental version of it, the CD also includes "You Know", featuring Zuwan of hip-hop group Viva Soul.

The single album is Park Jung-min's first Korean release since his mini-album THE, PARK JUNG MIN in April 2011. It marks the first release under his new agency Yamaha A&R, who Park signed with after his lawsuit against his old agency, CNr Media, had come to an end.

Park had his comeback performance at Mnet's M! Countdown on November 15, followed by MBC's Music Core two days later, performing the single album's title track "Beautiful".

The album reached 4th place on Hanteo's Weekly K-Pop Chart from November 12 to 18, 2012.

Track listing

Music videos
 "Beautiful"

Charts

References

External links
 
 

SS501 songs
2012 singles
2012 songs
Songs written by Park Jung-min (singer)